Robert George Faulkner (born December 27, 1933 in Bishop's Falls, Newfoundland) is a retired professional hockey player. In 1954 he became the first professional hockey player from Newfoundland and Labrador when he signed with the minor-pro Shawinigan-Falls Cataracts of the Quebec Senior Hockey League.

Playing career

Shawinigan Falls Cataracts
In 1954 George became the first player from Newfoundland to sign a professional contract with an NHL team. Faulkner played four seasons with the minor-pro Shawinigan Cataracts from 1954 to 1958. The Cataracts were owned by the Montreal Canadiens of the National Hockey League.

Conception Bay CeeBees
In 1958, then 24 years old, George was hired by the town of Harbour Grace as the community's recreational director. He helped run the hockey program with stadium manager Lorne Wakelin at the new Conception Bay Recreational Centre which opened in January 1958. His first task was to form a senior hockey team. The Conception Bay CeeBees, with George on defense as their playing-coach, were immediately a dominant force in the Newfoundland senior league making seven finals appearances in their first nine seasons, including four all-Newfoundland hockey championships.

1966 World Hockey Championships
In 1966 at the age of 32 Faulkner won a bronze medal and led Canada's national team in scoring with 6 goals and one assist in 7 games at the World Hockey Championships in Ljubljana, Yugoslavia. He finished 8th in tournament scoring with 7 points and tied for 3rd in goals with 6.

Personal life
George was born in the town of Bishop's Falls located on the shores of the Exploits River in Bishop's Falls, Newfoundland, Canada.  His parents were Lester, also born in Bishop's Falls, and Olive who was a native of Point Leamington. Lester's mother (Svea) was born in Burträsk, Sweden and his father (William) was born in Sherbrooke, Guysborough County, Nova Scotia. George had four hockey-playing brothers (Lindy, Seth, Alex, and Jack) and two sisters (Marie and Elizabeth).He first learned how to play hockey on the Exploits River with his brothers. His brother Alex was the first Newfoundlander to play in the National Hockey League. George started his hockey career at age 15 playing with the Bishop's Falls Woodsmen in the Grand Falls Senior league. In 1951 he played Junior B with the Quebec Citadelles.

His biography, titled Faulkner: A Hockey History, was published on November 30, 2011. It was written by Tom P. Rossiter, a retired educator.

As of 2016, at the age of 82, he still skates and sometimes plays hockey. In February 2016, he participated in a parents-versus-kids hockey game with his grandson George Faulkner Jr.
"I can say now that I've played with my two sons, Bob and Peter, and now I've played with my grandson," he said.

Career achievements

Championships
1952 Quebec Junior B Championship with the Quebec Junior B Citadelles.
1952 Ottawa District Hockey Association (ODHA)-Quebec Junior B Championship with the Quebec Junior B Citadelles.
In 1953 won his first all-Newfoundland senior hockey championship and Herder Memorial Trophy with the Grand Falls All-Stars.
Won the Quebec Senior Hockey League championship in 1955 and 1958 with the Shawinigan Falls Cataractes.
In 1955 won the Edinburgh Trophy with the Shawinigan Falls Cataractes. This was an east–west minor-pro hockey series between the champions of the Quebec Hockey League and the Western Hockey League.
Four Herder championships as playing-coach with the Conception Bay CeeBees in 1960, 1961, 1965 and 1967.
Won three Herders as Newfoundland provincial senior hockey champions with the St. John's Capitals, in 1973, 1974 and 1975.
In 1979 coached the St. John's Mike's Shamrocks to a Herder championship.

Awards and honours
Bronze medal winner with Canada's National Team at the 1966 World Hockey Championships
Inducted into the Sport Newfoundland and Labrador Hall of Fame in 1982
Inducted into the Newfoundland and Labrador Hockey Hall of Fame in 1994
Honoured by the Manitoba Hockey Hall of Fame as a member of Canada's National Team of 1966. Manitoba was home to the National Team from 1965 to 1970.
Voted Best Newfoundland and Labrador Hockey Player in a 1994 poll by The Telegram
Named Top Newfoundland and Labrador Athlete of all time in 1999 by The Telegram
Honorary Doctor of Laws Degree from Memorial University of Newfoundland, 2010
Torch bearer at 1992 Newfoundland Summer Games
Torch bearer at 2010 Vancouver Winter Olympics

Career statistics
''Note: GFISL = Grand Falls Inter-town School League, GFSHL = Grand Falls Senior Hockey League, QJBHL = Quebec Junior B Hockey League,  NAHA = Newfoundland Amateur Hockey Association, QJAHL = Quebec Junior A Hockey League, QHL = Quebec Hockey League, NSHL = Newfoundland Senior Hockey League

References

Bibliography

External links
 
 http://www.sportnl.ca/programs/hall_fame_view.php?id=48
 http://www.hockeynl.ca/hockey-hall-of-fame/inductees/f/george-faulkner/
 http://www.legendsofhockey.net/IZone/izone.world.hockey.games.leaders.do;jsessionid=F26DB42DB1C9B83EB305EEAAC39E0F20?tour=WEC&division=MA&yr=1966

1933 births
Living people
Canadian ice hockey defencemen
Canadian ice hockey left wingers
Ice hockey in Newfoundland and Labrador
Ice hockey people from Newfoundland and Labrador
Jacksonville Rockets players
People from Bishop's Falls
Shawinigan-Falls Cataracts (QSHL) players